Siraju Juma Kaboyonga (31 August 1949 – 11 December 2012) was a Member of Parliament in the National Assembly of Tanzania between 2005 and 2010.

References

External links
 Parliament of Tanzania profile

2012 deaths
Kaboyonga, Siraju Juma
1949 births
Place of birth missing